Metatrachelas is a genus of araneomorph spiders in the family Trachelidae, first described by J. Bosselaers & R. Bosmans in 2010.  it contains only three species.

References

External links

Araneomorphae genera
Trachelidae